The Philippine Tong Ho Institute is a Chinese high school in Lucena City,  Quezon. It was founded February 14, 1921. It has a small population of students and is a small campus.

References

External links
Lucenahin Community Website

Educational institutions established in 1921
Schools in Lucena, Philippines
Chinese-language schools in the Philippines
1921 establishments in the Philippines
High schools in Quezon